Oba Hills Forest Reserve is a reserve in Iwo, Osun State, Nigeria, that covers about 52 km2 of hilly terrain with deep gorges.
A 2003 report by the UICN said about 12% of the reserve had been planted with teak.
Some chimpanzee sightings had been reported, and in 1999 a dead chimp was offered for sale in a local market.
A 2009 report said that almost all of the reserve had been converted to plantations and farms, with only two gullies remaining forest-covered.
Chimpanzees are now thought to be almost extinct in the reserve.

It is located at an elevation of 253 meters above sea level.

References

Forest Reserves of Nigeria